Pseudobonellia is a genus of polychaetes belonging to the family Bonelliidae.

The species of this genus are found in Australia and Northern America.

Species:

Pseudobonellia biuterina 
Pseudobonellia iraidii

References

Polychaetes